The 2012 Rakuten Japan Open Tennis Championships was a men's tennis tournament played on outdoor hard courts. It was the 39th edition of the event known this year as the Rakuten Japan Open Tennis Championships, and part of the 500 Series of the 2012 ATP World Tour. It was held at the Ariake Coliseum in Tokyo, Japan, from October 1 till October 7, 2012. Kei Nishikori won the singles title

Singles main-draw entrants

Seeds

 1 Rankings are based on the rankings of September 24, 2012.

Other entrants
The following players received wildcards into the singles main draw:
  Tatsuma Ito
  Hiroki Moriya
  Yūichi Sugita

The following players received entry from the qualifying draw:
  Marco Chiudinelli
  Grigor Dimitrov
  Sergiy Stakhovsky
  Dmitry Tursunov

The following player received entry as lucky loser:
  Ivo Karlović

Withdrawals
  Mardy Fish
  Gaël Monfils (right knee injury)

Retirements
  Viktor Troicki (calf muscle injury)

Doubles main-draw entrants

Seeds

 Rankings are as of September 24, 2012

Other entrants
The following pairs received wildcards into the doubles main draw:
  Hiroki Moriya /  Takao Suzuki
  Yūichi Sugita /  Yasutaka Uchiyama

Retirements
  Janko Tipsarević (tonsillitis)

Finals

Singles

 Kei Nishikori defeated  Milos Raonic, 7–6(7–5), 3–6, 6–0

Doubles

 Alexander Peya /  Bruno Soares defeated  Leander Paes /  Radek Štěpánek, 6–3, 7–6(7–5)

References

External links 
 

Rakuten Japan Open Tennis Championships
Japan Open (tennis)
Rakuten Japan Open Tennis Championships
Rakuten Japan Open Tennis Championships